General elections were held in Myanmar on  2010, in accordance with the new constitution, which was approved in a referendum held in .

The elections were the fifth step of the seven-step "roadmap to democracy" proposed by the SPDC in 2003, the sixth and seventh steps being the convening of elected representatives and the building of a modern, democratic nation, respectively. However, the National League for Democracy boycotted the elections. The result was a sweeping victory for the Union Solidarity and Development Party, which won nearly 80% of seats contested across the upper and lower houses. The United Nations expressed concern about the fairness of the elections, and western countries dismissed them as fraudulent.

Due to the strict separation of powers in the constitution, members elected to the Pyidaungsu Hluttaw were automatically disqualified from their seats if they accepted appointment to an executive or judicial body. As a result, many elected members elected were quickly disqualified from their seats after accepting appointment to bodies such as the Cabinet of Myanmar. By-elections to fill 48 vacancies left by such appointments as well as by resignations and deaths were held in April 2012.

Background
Going into the elections, a debate emerged around whether Aung San Suu Kyi would be disqualified from contesting the elections under Article 59F of the new constitution, which banned from the Presidency any person whose spouse or children are foreign citizens. The United Nations, members of ASEAN, and Western nations, however, insisted that the elections would not be credible without the participation of Suu Kyi.

The National League for Democracy (NLD) had set a number of conditions for participating in the poll, including changes to the constitution to reduce the army's influence, international supervision for free and fair polls, and freeing all political prisoners including Suu Kyi. Senior General Than Shwe, leader of the ruling military junta, has pledged to release political prisoners in an amnesty before the election, though he has not stated when this would occur. On  2009, Suu Kyi was sentenced to imprisonment for three years with hard labour over a trespass incident.  This sentence was commuted by the military rulers to further house arrest of eighteen months. The NLD later announced they would not take part in the election due to the election laws.

Key ministries including justice, defence and the interior will remain under the control of the military and under the 2008 constitution, a quarter of the 440 parliament seats will be reserved for the military officials. People holding military positions are not permitted to contest the election; as such, 20 members of the junta, including Prime Minister Thein Sein, retired from their posts to participate in the election.

New election laws
The first of five election laws was announced in March 2010, concerning the creation of an election commission. The Union Election Commission Law states that the military government will appoint all members of the commission and have the final say over the election results. Members of the commission must be "an eminent person, to have integrity and experience, to be loyal to the state and its citizens". A 17-member election commission was later named, headed by a former military officer.

The second law bans anyone currently serving a prison term from belonging to a political party, and therefore over 2,000 political prisoners will not be able to participate, possibly including Aung San Suu Kyi (depending on whether her house arrest is deemed to fall under the definition of "serving a prison term"). The Political Parties Registration Law also bars members of religious orders, members of insurgent groups 'as defined by the state' and foreigners from joining political parties. This separation of Buddhism and politics is a long-standing feature of Myanmar politics, dating back to before independence, and was incorporated in the 1947 independence Constitution at the request of the monkhood.

The other laws stipulate that anyone currently serving a prison term is barred from running or voting in the elections for the upper and lower houses. A 224-member House of Nationalities will have 168 elected candidates and 56 nominated by the military chief, while the 440-member House of Representatives will have 330 elected civilians and 110 military representatives. At the same time, the results of the 1990 elections were annulled as they did not comply with the new election laws.

The new laws have been described as a "farce" by the Philippines and a "mockery" by the United States.

Political parties

The National League for Democracy, which overwhelmingly won the previous 1990 elections but were never allowed to take power, decided not to participate. Nonetheless, some senior members have formed the National Democratic Force to contest the elections, claiming that a boycott would play into the hands of the government.

The government has established the Union Solidarity and Development Party, the successor to the mass organisation Union Solidarity and Development Association, which claims to have around half the population as members. The National Unity Party, which contested the 1990 election as the main pro-government party and won 10 seats, has also registered to run. Reuters estimates that six parties in total are allied to the government.

The new Democratic Party, established by Mya Than Than Nu, the daughter of former Prime Minister of Myanmar, U Nu and Nay Ye Ba Swe, the daughter of former Prime Minister Ba Swe, is aiming to take part in the election. Mya Than Than Nu will run as General Secretary of the party. Media coverage of the party has been banned by the military government.

Another new party is being formed comprising members of a ceasefire group and a party that won seats in the 1990 elections. Five former members of the New Mon State Party (NMSP) and five members of Mon National Democratic Front (MNDF) together with five other Mon elites, who make up the new party, founded a 15-member committee and later announced that they are not going to participate in the upcoming election.

The Shan Nationalities League for Democracy, a Shan political party that came second in the 1990 election, is participating in the election as the Shan Nationalities Democratic Party.

The SPDC has not answered opposition calls to amend the 2008 constitution or state clearly how the electoral process will be managed and the terms that new political parties can organise. In a speech to military retirees, Than Shwe said that the transition to a parliamentary system meant various parties with different opinions would appear, but he warned that the new parties should "avoid anything that leads to harming state interests".

The constituencies available for contesting are 330 civilian seats in the House of Representatives (out of 440) and 168 civilian seats in the House of Nationalities (out of 224). The remaining seats are designated for military officials and to be selected by the military chief.

During an East Asian summit in Vietnam, Foreign Minister Nyan Win confirmed Than Shwe would not be running in the election.

Contesting political parties
Mro or Khami National Solidarity Organisation (MKNSO)
National Unity Party (NUP)
Lahu National Development Party (LNDP)
Kokang Democracy and Unity Party (KDUP)
Pa-O National Organisation (PNO)
Democratic Party (Myanmar) (DPM)
Kayan National Party (KNP)
Rakhine State National Force of Myanmar (RSNF)
Kayin People's Party (KPP)
Wa National Unity Party (WNUP)
Ta'ang National Party (TPNP)
All Mon Region Democracy Party (AMRDP)
Democracy and Peace Party (DPP)
Shan Nationalities Democratic Party (SNDP)
United Democratic Party (UnitedDP)
888 Generation Student Youths (Union of Myanmar, 8GSY)
Union of Myanmar Federation of National Politics (UMNPF)
National Political Alliances League (NPAL)
Democratic Party for Myanmar New Society (DPMNS)
Chin National Party (CNP)
Wuntharnu NLD (Union of Myanmar, WNLD)
Modern People Party  (MPP)
Union Democratic Party  (UnionDP)
Peace and Diversity Party  (PDP)
Chin Progressive Party  (CPP)
Inn National Progressive Party (INPP)
Rakhine Nationalities Development Party (RNDP)
Wa Democratic Party (WDP)
Phalon-Sawaw Democratic Party (PSDP)
National Democratic Party for Development (NDPD)
Union Solidarity and Development Party (USDP)
Ethnic National Development Party (ENDP)
Myanmar Democracy Congress (MDC)
Mro National Party (MNP)
Kaman National Progressive Party (KNPP)
Khami National Development Party (KNDP)
National Democratic Force (NDF)
Regional Development Party (Pyay, RDPP)
Unity and Democracy Party of Kachin State (UDPKS)

Conduct

Cancelled elections
Due to ongoing insurgent violence, elections were cancelled in parts of Mon State (4.08% of village-tracts), Shan State (10.69%), Kayah State (11.93%), Kachin State (16.60%), and Kayin State (47.25%).

Violence 
There have been concerns from aid agencies that the upcoming election could see a growing number of refugees fleeing to Thailand and China, due to alleged government repression, poverty and low-level ethnic conflict. Ceasefires between the military government and ethnic groups were also deteriorating.

In the run up to the election, there were several bomb blasts in Myanmar. A bomb attack on Myanmar New Year killed at least nine people in Yangon and injured many others, including the regional commander of the Myanma Army, while a series of explosions were reported at a hydroelectric project being jointly built by a Chinese company in the north of the country, the latter thought to be the work of anti-government groups.

International response
The United Nations has expressed concern about the fairness of the election and United Nations Secretary-General Ban Ki-moon expressed "grave concern" that Aung San Suu Kyi would not be released before the election and thus it would "lack credibility." He accused the government of being "slow and incomplete" to meet political commitments, and said it was "deeply frustrating" that the government would not hold talks with the "international community."

The Chinese Foreign Ministry spokeswoman, Jiang Yu, commented on the election during Than Shwe's visit to China. "The international community can provide constructive help [for the elections] and refrain from any negative impact on the domestic political process of Myanmar and on regional peace and stability."

The following day, US Secretary of State Hillary Clinton spoke to the US Senate Appropriations Committee Subcommittee on State and Foreign Affairs where she mentioned that the trial against Aung San Suu Kyi was allegedly "baseless charges." She also added that the government was "continuing resistance to a free and open electoral process. If they stay on the track they're on, their elections in 2010 will be totally illegitimate and without any meaning in the international community." She admitted that "We are absolutely committed to trying to come up with an approach that might influence the regime. We are going to try to do our best to influence them to see that this repressive regime is not one that we should continue to support, and hopefully get a greater international base to take action against them." She claimed to have support from other countries, "I have been heartened by the response that we have received. I have spoken to a number of the foreign secretaries of ASEAN countries, who've issued strong statements." She added that she was working to get more support in the United Nations.

UK Foreign Minister William Hague said that "holding flawed elections does not represent change."

Monitors
Myanmar barred foreign observers and the international media from the election. The election commission chief, Thein Soe, did add, however, that diplomats and representatives from UN organisations in the country would be allowed to observe the election. He justified the decision saying "We are holding the election for this country. It's not for other countries ... We will have credibility after holding the election in front of all the people."

Election day
The election was held amid tight security. Initial reports pointed to a light turnout across the country, possibly as low as 20% in some areas, and the possibility of irregularities. The Guardian reported that independent local observers were reporting "widespread voter intimidation and bribery" in the election.

Results
On 11 November, state radio announced the results for 147 constituencies in the Lower House, with the USDP winning 133. The USDP won 81 of 86 races newly announced for the Upper House. The new and previously announced results show the USDP gained majorities in both houses of parliament: 190 out of the 219 (86%) seats announced for the 330-seat lower house, and 95 out of 107 (88%) seats announced for the 168-seat upper house.

The Union Solidarity and Development Party (USDP) won 80% of the seats that were up for election. The two largest opposition parties, the National Democratic Front and the Democratic Party conceded defeat; however, along with four other opposition parties, filed formal complaints about fraud with the election commission.

The final results were announced by the Myanmar Union Election Commission on 17 November 2010.
Detailed results in English are available.

House of Nationalities
168 of the 224 seats in the Amyotha Hluttaw (House of Nationalities) were up for election. The remaining 56 seats (25%) were not elected, and instead reserved for military appointees (taken from Tatmadaw personnel; officially known as "Army Representatives").

House of Representatives 
325 of the 440 seats in the Pyithu Hluttaw (House of Representatives) were up for election after 5 seats in Shan State were cancelled. The remaining 110 seats (25%) were not elected, and instead reserved for military appointees (taken from Tatmadaw personnel; officially known as "Army Representatives").

Reactions
Than Nyein, the chairman of the National Democratic Force, claimed the election was marred by irregularities. "We have our evidence. Some candidates complained ... because there was vote cheating." Khin Maung Swe, the leader of the opposition National Democratic Force alleged: "We took the lead at the beginning but the USDP later came up with so-called advance votes and that changed the results completely, so we lost."

UN Secretary-General Ban Ki-moon claimed voting conditions had been "insufficiently inclusive, participatory and transparent."

The People's Republic of China's Foreign Ministry  said the election was "a critical step for Myanmar in implementing the seven-step road map in the transition to an elected government, and thus is welcome."

India was conspicuously silent with segments of the Indian media questioning whether principle gave way to expediency.

Russian Foreign Minister Sergey Lavrov welcomed the vote and characterised it as a "step forward in the democratisation of Burmese society."

During a speech to the Indian parliament, US President Barack Obama said of the election that "When peaceful democratic movements are suppressed – as in Burma – then the democracies of the world cannot remain silent ... It is unacceptable to steal an election as the regime in Burma has done again for the world to see."

Edwin Lacierda, the spokesperson of Philippine President Benigno Aquino III, said in a press conference at Malacañan Palace that " [We] express our disappointment towards the actions done by the Burmese government towards the NLD, and also with regards to such a farce-like elections which just appeared to be a display."

Analysis
At the time of the election Aljazeera argued that the election marginalised Aung San Suu Kyi. It  asked "How much power and reach would she still have to rally her followers barely a week after the south-east Asian nation's first general election in two decades?" One such reason was because the NLD's boycott may have failed if it does not play the right cards in dealing with at least a semblance of an elected opposition in a "semi-legitimate" parliament. Pending her release from jail, the political atmosphere would have changed because of a new military leadership that may not be as "cosmopolitan" and "practical" in dealing both with her and external players. The British ambassador to Myanmar, Andrew Heyn, also said: "What they the junta do when Suu Kyi is released will send a message. She is well informed and committed and wants to stay involved."

Aftermath 

The following day clashes erupted between the Democratic Karen Buddhist Army (DKBA) and government forces in Myawaddy by the Thai border. The fighting spilled over to the town of Three Pagodas Pass with reports that the DKBA had seized the town from the military. According to some reports, the DKBA planned the action in the towns of Myawaddy and Three Pagodas Pass to take advantage of the deployment of the military for election monitoring. Many voters in the area, fearing an attack, stayed away from the polls.

Opposition leader Aung San Suu Kyi was released from house arrest on 13 November, despite a court ruling quashing her release. She then said there were no regrets over her party's boycott of the election. To have change, she said, "The people have to want it, and they have to be united."

Suu Kyi and her party participated and won seats in the subsequent 2012 by-elections. The next Myanmar general election was held in 2015.

Changes during the term of office
On 9 September 2011 Tun Aung Khaing (USDP) replaced Aung Kyaw Zan (RNDP) who had been removed from office.

References

External links
Burma Election 2010 – The Irrawaddy
Election Information
Pierce, Patrick. Impunity or Reconciliation in Burma's Transition, International Center for Transitional Justice
Election coverage – Mizzima

Elections in Myanmar
Myanmar
2010 in Myanmar
Burmese democracy movements
Myanmar
Election and referendum articles with incomplete results